Toyofumi Aruga (born 16 November 1942) is a Japanese speed skater. He competed in three events at the 1964 Winter Olympics.

References

1942 births
Living people
Japanese male speed skaters
Olympic speed skaters of Japan
Speed skaters at the 1964 Winter Olympics
Sportspeople from Hokkaido